Miarka (French title: Miarka, la fille à l'ourse) is a 1937 French drama film directed by Jean Choux and starring Suzanne Desprès, Marcel Dalio and José Noguéro. The film based on the 1883 novel Miarka by Jean Richepin, which had previously been turned into a 1920 silent film.

Cast
 Suzanne Desprès as Sara  
 Marcel Dalio as Le maire  
 José Noguéro as Luigi  
 Rama-Tahé as Miarka  
 Marcel Vallée as Le maître d'école  
 Roger Legris as L'innocent  
 Jeanne Fusier-Gir as La gouvernante  
 Jean Toulout as Le garde-champêtre  
 Arthur Devère 
 Elmire Vautier as La soeur de l'innocent  
 Félix Oudart as Le curé 
 Freddie Bernard as Luigi enfant 
 Nutzi Ipceanu as Une gitane  
 Noël Roquevert 
 Carmencita Vallejo as Miarka enfant

References

Bibliography 
 Spratt, Geoffrey K. The Music of Arthur Honegger. Cork University Press, 1987.

External links 
 

1937 films
1937 drama films
French drama films
1930s French-language films
Films directed by Jean Choux
French black-and-white films
1930s French films